Edward Wemple (October 23, 1843 in Fultonville, Montgomery County, New York – December 18, 1920 in Fultonville, Montgomery County, New York) was an American businessman and U.S. Representative from New York.

Life
Wemple attended the public schools in Fultonville and Ashland Academy, and graduated from Union College in 1866. Then he studied law for a time and engaged in the foundry business in partnership with his two brothers.   In 1868 he married Adelaide F. Groat (1844-1895), and the couple had six children.

He was President of the Village of Fultonville in 1873, and Supervisor of the Town of Glen from 1874 to 1876. He was a member of the New York State Assembly (Montgomery Co.) in 1877 and 1878.

Wemple was elected as a Democrat to the 48th United States Congress, holding office from March 4, 1883, to March 3, 1885.  In Congress he worked to secure funding for the Saratoga Monument commemorating the Battles of Saratoga.

He was a member of the New York State Senate (18th D.) in 1886 and 1887. He was New York State Comptroller from 1888 to 1891, elected at the New York state election, 1887 and the New York state election, 1889.

On November 13, 1895, he was arrested on charges of arson. He had burned down his own foundry, after it had been sold at an assignee's sale, and several other buildings in and around Fultonville.  On December 2, he was pronounced insane, taken to the Utica Insane Asylum, and later transferred to the Middletown State Hospital. On August 13, 1909, he was released from Middletown Asylum, and taken home to Fultonville.

He died on December 18, 1920; and was buried at the Maple Avenue Cemetery in Fultonville.

Sources

  Pronounced insane, in The New York Times on December 3, 1895
 WEMPLE OUT OF ASYLUM in NYT on August 14, 1909

References

External links

1843 births
1920 deaths
Democratic Party members of the New York State Assembly
New York State Comptrollers
Democratic Party New York (state) state senators
People from Fultonville, New York
Town supervisors in New York (state)
Union College (New York) alumni
Democratic Party members of the United States House of Representatives from New York (state)